La nottata is a 1974 Italian film directed by Tonino Cervi.

Plot 

The film is set in Milan, where Susy and Angela meet in a club bathroom. There, they take possession of a ring forgotten by a lady. After going to movie, they meet Vito, a taxi-driver who promises to help them selling the ring. The search for a buyer begins at a fence's house and continues until a party at the house of Destino, a travesti, where a jeweler buys the ring at a fraudulent price that the trio are forced to pay. But, after going out and loading a "life boy" (ragazzo di vita) in the car, they realize that the money is gone.

Despite this setback, the evening continues and, after a meeting with Marta and Davide, a rich vicious couple who involve them in erotic games, the two girls fight, to the disappointment of Susy who seems not to accept the greatest success of Angela with   men. At this moment the three separate: Angela spends a disappointing night with Piero, a young boy met in the villa of the vicious couple, while Susy goes to the station to leave Milan. In the morning the two girls meet again and after confessing that Angela took the money that seemed to have disappeared and Susy managed to steal the ring from the jeweler, they become friends.

Cast

 Sara Sperati: Susy
 Susanna Javicoli: Angela
 Giancarlo Prete: Vito, taxi-driver
 Max Delys: Piero
 Giorgio Albertazzi: Destino
 Martine Brochard: Marta
 Claudio Cassinelli: Davide
 Raoul Casadei: himself
 Giuliana Calandra: the owner of the ring
 Riccardo Berlingieri
 Aldo Bonamano
 Emilio Lo Curcio
 Francesco Bagagli
 Elisa Mainardi
 Delio Cioni
 Luciana Passin 
 Angelo Pellegrino: the fence
 Benedetto Simonelli
 Gino Uras 
 Gabriele Villa

References

External links
 

1974 films
1974 drama films
Italian drama films
1970s Italian-language films
Films set in 1974
Films set in Italy
Films set in Milan
1970s Italian films